The Union League Club of Chicago is a prominent civic and social club in Chicago that was founded in 1879. Its second and current clubhouse is located at 65 W Jackson Boulevard on the corner of Federal Street, in the Loop neighborhood of Chicago. The club is considered one of the most prestigious in Chicago, ranking fouth in the United States and first in the Midwest on the Five Star Platinum Club list.

Union League clubs, which are legally separate but share similar histories and maintain reciprocal links with one another, are also located in New York City and Philadelphia. Additional Union League clubs were formerly located in Brooklyn, New York and New Haven.

History
Founded in 1879, the Union League Club of Chicago (the Club) traces its roots to the earlier  Union League of America.

The Union League of America was founded during the American Civil War to support Abraham Lincoln and preserve the Union.  Its first council was founded on June 25, 1862, in Pekin, Illinois and spread rapidly across the North with the first Chicago council formed on August 19, 1862.

After the last Chicago council of the Union League of America disbanded in 1877, Orrin H. Salisbury, a local politician and former member, conceived an idea of a new club in the same tradition that would influence local, state and national politics.  He approached John Wentworth ("Long John") who saw in the idea a "marching club" to specifically support Ulysses S. Grant's bid for a third term as President. Even after Grant lost his bid for a third term, Wentworth recruited heavily for the Club.

The Club was incorporated as the Chicago Club of the Union League of America on December 19, 1879. It was later renamed The Union League Club of Chicago.   The first directors included, among others, James B. Bradwell, John Wentworth, William Penn Nixon, and John H. Kedzie.  The Club had two sets of officers its first year: James B Bradwell and Lewis Larned Coburn, both elected as President of the Club.

In the Articles of Association, the Club's primary objectives are to (paraphrased): encourage loyalty to the Federal Government, defend the Union, inculcate good citizenship, maintain equality of all citizens, and assure the purity of the ballot, and oppose corruption, and secure honesty in the administration of National, State, and Municipal affairs.  At the same time, some members, led by R. S. Critchell, wanted the Club to have the amenities of a social club including fine dining. Today, according to the Club's website, it is both "a catalyst for action in nonpartisan political, economic and social arenas"  and a social club with "an array of unique opportunities for entertainment and personal growth" and fine dining.

The Club's website states: "the Public Affairs Committee and its various subcommittees address a wide range of public policy issues and serve as the conduit for the Club’s involvement in civic affairs".   Some of these issues have included:  
 Enacting election reform 
 Enabling the Chicago Crime Commission 
 1970 Constitutional Convention 
 Siting and opening of the Harold Washington Library Center
 Informing the establishment of a moratorium on the death penalty in Illinois 

The Club is one of The Top 100 Platinum City Clubs of the World for 2020/2021.

Building

Clubhouse 
The Club's first clubhouse was designed by William Le Baron Jenney. The current clubhouse, built on the same site as the first, was designed by Mundie & Jensen. The building houses meeting rooms, overnight guest rooms, 5 dining areas, a pool and workout facilities.

Art Collection 
The Club’s art collection is extensive prompting the Chicago Tribune to call the Club “The other art institute in Chicago”  The same article cites  Monet’s “Pommiers en fleurs” as the Club’s most significant painting and discusses the depth of the collection in historic and contemporary Chicago artists.

The George N Leighton Library 
According to the Club's website, the Library and Archives are one of the oldest amenities of the Club.  The Library was renamed in 2019 to honor long-time member and jurist, George N. Leighton.  The Club is a Partner Organization with the Chicago Collections in order to share its archives more broadly.

Notable members 
Dankmar Adler. architect, designed Auditorium Theater
Robert W. Bergstrom. led 1970 Illinois Constitutional Convention 
James B. Bradwell. Illinois lawyer, judge, politician, represented Mary Todd Lincoln 
Daniel Burnham. architect, Director of Works, World’s Columbian Exposition 
Charles G. Dawes. 30th Vice President of the United States  
Marshall Field. founder of Marshall Field and Company 
Charles L. Hutchinson. business leader, 1st president of the Art Institute of Chicago
William Le Baron Jenney. architect, designed Home Insurance Building 
John H. Kedzie. lawyer, real estate developer, member Illinois House of Representatives  
George N. Leighton. United States District Judge 
William Penn Nixon. President of Chicago Inter Ocean 
Julius Rosenwald. leader and part-owner of Sears, Roebuck and Company 
Louis Sullivan. architect, including Auditorium Theater and Carson Pirie Scott Store
John Wentworth ("Long John"). Mayor of Chicago, member of US House of Representatives, editor of Chicago Democrat

Foundations and military support

Foundations 
The Club sponsors and houses the administrative staff of 3 non-profit foundations, according to the Foundations' websites,  
 Union League Boys & Girls Clubs provides after school programs at 11 locations in Chicago and a summer camp in Wisconsin.   Club One was founded in Chicago’s Pilsen neighborhood as the Union League Boys Club in 1919.
Luminarts Cultural Foundation was founded in 1949 as the Union League Civic & Arts Foundation.  It supports young Chicago artists, writers, and musicians through the annual selection of Luminarts Fellows.
The Chicago Engineers’ Foundation evolved from the Chicago Engineers’ Club, an organization established in 1903 as a professional and networking group for the Chicago engineers.

Military support 
According to the Club's website, it supports the men and women of the armed services through the following groups: 
The Club’s American Legion Post #758 was established in 1934.
The Chicago 502, organized by the Club in 2001, supports the soldiers and families of the 502nd Infantry Regiment of the 101st Airborne Division.  
The 721 Club supported the commissioning and now supports the crew and families of the USS Chicago (SSN-721) submarine.
The 786 Club supported the commissioning and now supports the crew and families of the USS Illinois (SSN-786) submarine. 
The Club sponsored the Commissioning Committee for the USS Hyman G. Rickover (SSN-709) submarine.

See also

Union League
Union League of Philadelphia
Union League Club of New York
Union League Golf and Country Club
List of gentlemen's clubs in the United States

References

Further reading
Nowlan, James D. (2004). Glory, Darkness, Light: A History of the Union League Club. Northwestern University Press. 
Union League Club of Chicago Art Collection. 
Kellman, Jerold (1984). The First One Hundred Years. 
Grant, Bruce (1955). Fight for a City: The story of the Union League Club of Chicago and its times, 1880-1955. John S. Swift Co. 
The Union League Club of Chicago (1926). The spirit of the Union League Club, 1879-1926: presented by the Club to its members on the occasion of the dedication of the new clubhouse.  The Club.

External links

 
Union League Boys & Girls Clubs website
Luminarts website
Chicago Engineers' Foundation website
Chicago 721 Club website 
Chicago 786 Club website 
USS Hyman G. Rickover (SSN 796) Commissioning Committee
Chicago Collections website

Non-profit organizations based in Chicago
1879 establishments in Illinois
Clubs and societies in the United States
Illinois in the American Civil War
Gentlemen's clubs in the United States
Skyscrapers in Chicago
Skyscrapers in Illinois